The men's large hill individual ski jumping competition for the 2002 Winter Olympics was held in Park City, United States. The competition went for two days, with the qualifying round on February 12 and the final rounds on February 13.

Results

Qualifying

Fourteen skiers were pre-qualified, on the basis of their World Cup performance, meaning that they directly advanced to the final round. These skiers still jumped in the qualifying round, but they were not included with non-pre-qualified skiers in the standings. The fifty-two skiers who were not pre-qualified competed for thirty-six spots in the final round.

Final
The final consisted of two jumps, with the top thirty after the first jump qualifying for the second jump. The combined total of the two jumps was used to determine the final ranking.

References

Ski jumping at the 2002 Winter Olympics